The 1969 Campeonato Nacional de Futbol Profesional was Chilean first tier’s 37th season. Universidad de Chile were the champions, winning its seventh title.

First stage

Torneo Metropolitano

Torneo Provincial

Torneo Nacional

Zona A

Interzone

Zona B

Interzone

Final Stage

Liguilla Final

Relegation play-off

Topscorer

Copa Ganadores de Copa 1970 play-off

Unión Española qualified for the 1970 Copa Ganadores de Copa

Copa Francisco Candelori
Played between the winners of the Torneo Metropolitano 1969 (Universidad de Chile) and Torneo Provincial 1969 (Rangers).

Universidad de Chile won the Copa Francisco Candelori

References

External links
ANFP 
RSSSF Chile 1969

Primera División de Chile seasons
Chile
Prim